Bungei may refer to:

 Bungei (magazine), a Japanese literary magazine
 The Bungei Prize, a literary prize of Japan, awarded by Bungei
 Bungeishunjū, a Japanese publishing company known for its literary magazine of the same name
 Wilfred Bungei, Kenyan middle-distance runner
Clerodendrum bungei, an ornamental shrub native to China